The Essential Jacksons is the first compilation to cover The Jacksons' fourteen-year-long tenure at CBS/Epic Records. Released on March 9, 2004 by Epic, this compilation includes hits such as "Enjoy Yourself", "Shake Your Body (Down to the Ground)", "Can You Feel It", and "State of Shock".

Track listing

Charts

References

2004 greatest hits albums
Epic Records compilation albums
The Jackson 5 compilation albums